Blue Mountain Hospital offers medical services in John Day, Oregon, United States. Part of the Blue Mountain Hospital District, it was built in 1949 in Prairie City and re-built in 1960 in John Day. The hospital district, a non-profit managed by a local board of directors, includes Blue Mountain Nursing Home, a 52-bed unit in Prairie City.

The hospital has three monitored intensive-care beds, two birthing suites, and two surgery suites for inpatient and outpatient surgeries. It has a 24-hour emergency department, a helipad on site that can provide rapid transport in critical cases, and an ambulance service. The hospital also has a large bore MRI machine, installed in 2013. It offers outreach clinics in nearby communities and monthly clinics in John Day with physicians specializing in urology, orthopedics, gynecology, ophthalmology, cardiology, and podiatry.

See also
List of hospitals in Oregon

References

External links
U.S. News Hospital Directory

 

Hospitals in Oregon
Buildings and structures in Grant County, Oregon
Hospitals established in 1949
1949 establishments in Oregon
Hospital buildings completed in 1960